Montcalm is a municipality in the Les Laurentides Regional County Municipality of Quebec southeast of Mont-Tremblant. The main population centre in Montcalm is the village of Weir.

Demographics
Population trend:
 Population in 2011: 619 (2006 to 2011 population change: -5.1%)
 Population in 2006: 652
 Population in 2001: 534
 Population in 1996: 449
 Population in 1991: 369

Private dwellings occupied by usual residents: 308 (total dwellings: 663)

Mother tongue:
 English as first language: 25%
 French as first language: 73.5%
 English and French as first language: 1.5%
 Other as first language: 0%

Weir
Weir is an unincorporated village in Montcalm, accessible via Quebec Route 364. It is home to a satellite earth station for VSNL International Canada.

Weir is named after William Alexander Weir (1858-1929), a Quebec politician and judge.

Education

Sir Wilfrid Laurier School Board operates English-language schools:
 Arundel Elementary School in Arundel
 Laurentian Regional High School in Lachute serves almost all of Montcalm

References

External links

Municipalité de Montcalm
Atlas of Canada - Montcalm
Commission de toponymie du Quebec

Incorporated places in Laurentides
Municipalities in Quebec